Eucosma sonomana, the western pineshoot borer, is a moth of the family Tortricidae. It is found in western North America.

The wingspan is 16–22 mm. Adults are on wing for two to three months during the spring. There is one generation per year.

Larvae feed on pine species and is considered a pest on Pinus ponderosa. They mine the pith of terminal shoots.

External links
 Factsheet

Eucosmini
Moths of North America
Moths described in 1907